In Greek mythology, Siproites or Siproetes is the name of a Cretan hero, who saw the goddess Artemis naked while she was bathing and was then transformed into a woman, paralleling the story of the hunter Actaeon.

Mythology 
Siproites, while hunting, saw Artemis bathing naked; in response to the sight, the virgin goddess turned him into a woman:

The Cretan, Siproites, had also been turned into a woman for having seen Artemis bathing when out hunting.

The full story of Siproites has been lost; the above passage is all that remains, as Antoninus Liberalis alone preserves the tale in a brief mention. This sex-change tale shares similarities with the myth of Athena blinding Tiresias for seeing her naked.

See also 

 Caeneus
 Leucippus
 Iphis
 Tiresias

Notes

References 
 Antoninus Liberalis, The Metamorphoses of Antoninus Liberalis, translated by Francis Celoria (Routledge 1992). Online version at topos text.
 
 
 

Metamorphoses into the opposite sex in Greek mythology
Deeds of Artemis
Transgender topics and mythology
LGBT themes in Greek mythology
Mythological hunters
Cretan characters in Greek mythology